AOR-2 may refer to:

, a former warship of the United States Navy
AOR-2, a military camouflage pattern used on uniforms by the U.S. Navy